Loch Lomond is a 75-acre man-made lake in Mundelein, Illinois, as well as the subdivision built around it. The lake is administered by the Loch Lomond Property Owners Association, and access is restricted to members of the association and their guests.

There are two beaches open to the residents of Loch Lomond:  North Beach & South Beach.  South Beach is the larger of the two and the main swimming area, with a large pier, raft, and playground area.  This beach also offers swimming lessons in the summer.  North Beach is favored for fishing; while swimming is allowed, no lifeguards are on duty.

Loch Lomond forbids motorized water sports, but row boats, kayaks, pedal boats, and even small sailing boats are common.

This shallow lake (5–8 ft deep) has had an interesting ecological experiment taking place over the last few decades. In the 1990s a non-native carp species was introduced to the lake to alleviate the algae bloom problems from elevated levels of nutrients. However, this carp species is a non-selective feeder and has decimated lake bed vegetation which has led to lower oxygen levels negatively impacting fish populations. Several "fish kills" have happened due to low oxygen levels primarily in the  winter in the history of the lake, but as of present a robust population of "game" fish species can be found in the murky waters.

Loch Lomond was formed in 1955, when the Arthur T. McIntosh Company constructed a dam across the southern branch of Bull Creek, to create a centerpiece for residential development. The 550-foot dam and 50-foot concrete spillway were originally planned to be a roadway connecting the north and south sections of our subdivision. The Owners Association maintains and operates the dam under a plan developed by professional engineers. The Illinois Department of Natural Resources regulates dams in Illinois; the dam is subject to their requirements including regular inspections.

References

External links
https://lochlomondlake.com/

Reservoirs in Illinois
Protected areas of Lake County, Illinois
Mundelein, Illinois
Landforms of Lake County, Illinois
1955 establishments in Illinois